The Clouser Deep Minnow is an artificial fly commonly categorized as a streamer and is fished under the water surface.  It is a popular and widely used pattern for both freshwater and saltwater game fish and is generally listed as one of the top patterns to have in any fly box, especially for bass and saltwater flats fishing.

Origin 
The original Clouser Deep Minnow evolved from traditional bucktail streamers and was created in 1987 by Bob Clouser, a Pennsylvania fly shop owner and guide.  The original patterns were intended for smallmouth bass on the Susquehanna River.  The name Clouser Deep Minnow was coined by Lefty Kreh, a noted Fly Fishing writer in a 1989 article in Fly Fisherman.  Today, the Clouser Deep Minnow is widely used for many species of both fresh and saltwater game fish.  Lefty Kreh claims to have caught over 87 species of game fish on Clouser Deep Minnow flies.

Imitates 
The Clouser Deep Minnow is an imitation of a baitfish, although there are many variations intended to imitate very specific baitfish in different fresh and saltwater situations.

Materials 
The original Clouser Deep Minnow pattern was tied with bucktail and krystal flash. However today, Clouser Deep Minnows are tied in a wide variety of color combinations and material combinations. The widespread availability of synthetic hair-like materials today, make the creation of an almost infinite number of Clouser Deep Minnow variations possible. The originals were tied on a number 2 saltwater hook with either a white bucktail belly, gold krystal flash and natural brown bucktail wing or white belly, silver krystal flash and gray dyed bucktail.

Variations and sizes 
Clouser Deep Minnow flies are typically tied on number 1/0 to 10 short to long hooks, with lead or tungsten dumbbell eyes.

References

External links
 Video of Bob Clouser tying the Clouser Minnow – Fly Fisherman

Notes

Streamer patterns